Gates of Heaven is a 1978 documentary film by Errol Morris.

Gates of Heaven may also refer to:

Gates of Heaven (album), a 2003 album by Do As Infinity
The Gates of Heaven, a 1945 Italian film directed by Vittorio De Sica
Gates of Heaven Synagogue, Madison, Wisconsin
The Pearly gates

See also
Heaven's Gate (disambiguation)
Gate of Heaven Cemetery (disambiguation)
Porta Coeli (disambiguation)